Eating the Cheshire Cat is a 2000 novel by Helen Ellis. It follows three girls from Alabama—Sarina, Nicole, and Bitty Jack—as they grow up.

Notes

External links 
In Person Helen Ellis at BookPeople, The Austin Chronicle.
Paperbacks, The Independent.
Eating the Cheshire Cat , Entertainment Weekly.

2000 American novels
American bildungsromans
Novels set in Alabama
2000 debut novels